Amegnran is a town in the Vo Prefecture in the Maritime Region of southern Togo.

References

External links
Satellite map at Maplandia.com

Populated places in Maritime Region